The Mutants, or Hill People, are the main antagonists of The Hills Have Eyes remake film series. The Mutants are deformed outcasts, created through radiation poisoning.

Origin 

The teaser trailers and prologue of the 2006 remake of The Hills Have Eyes, as well as newspaper clippings seen in the film and dialogue from mutant character Big Brain, reveals that the Mutants are the way they are due to radiation. Sometime in the fifties during the Cold War, the American government forced the populace of a New Mexico mining town off their land to perform nuclear testing in the area, unaware that the town's inhabitants fled to the nearby mines, where they were exposed to radiation given off by the atomic bombs being tested. Subsequent generations of these miners were born as malformed Mutants. 

The graphic novel The Hills Have Eyes: The Beginning expands upon this origin, revealing that only some of the miners gave birth to Mutants; those that did were driven from the nuclear testing village the miners inhabited after the government stopped testing in the area, and sent back into the mines to live a meager existence on supplies sold to them by a nearby gas station owner named Jeb. When Jeb became unable to supply the Mutants any longer, the Mutants' leader, Karen Sawney Bean, made a deal with him; Jeb would trick anyone who ventured to his gas station into going into the Mutants' territory, where they would be killed and eaten, with any valuables they had being given to Fred and his family to sell. Soon after Karen Sawney Bean died, her son, Hades, became the Mutants' leader. The Mutants, led by Hades, attacked the nearby nuclear testing village sometime after Karen's death, killing everyone in it and taking it as their own.

In the first The Hills Have Eyes, a vacationing family known as the Carters were tricked into travelling through the Mutants' domain by Jeb, where they managed to kill almost every member of a clan of Mutants; though two of the four surviving members of the Carter family were subsequently killed by the Mutants, two others managed to escape and were found by police, who they informed about the Mutants.

After the dying broadcast of a police officer, who was a part of a slaughtered group of officers investigating the Mutants' nuclear test village, was received, the army was sent in to exterminate the Mutants. Though the Mutants managed to kill a large number of attacking soldiers and destroy an army tank, their village home was inevitably destroyed and those Mutants that survived the military assault retreated to the mines, unnoticed by the army. In The Hills Have Eyes 2, Hades' clan and his children wreak havoc on unsuspecting military soldiers, but Hades is ultimately killed along with the majority of his offspring.

Mutants appearing in The Hills Have Eyes (Jupiter's Clan)

Big Brain

Big Brain is an apparent authority figure of Jupiter's clan, as he is shown issuing commands to other mutants on multiple occasions through a walkie-talkie. Big Brain apparently suffers from an extreme case of hydrocephalus and goitres, explaining his large distended head and bloated throat. Due to his physical condition, Big Brain is incapable of walking and confined to an old-fashioned wheelchair. Big Brain is portrayed by actor Desmond Askew.

Doug Bukowski finds Big Brain in an electronics-filled house in the mutants' nuclear test village home. While interrogating Big Brain on his daughter's whereabouts, Doug learns about the mutants' origins; when he threatens Big Brain with a baseball bat, Big Brain summons an axe-wielding Pluto. Doug eventually succeeds in killing Pluto but, concerned for his baby, cannot spare the time to kill Big Brain. Big Brain then commands Lizard to kill Catherine on his walkie talkie, before he is mauled to death by Beast.

Earlier in the film, Big Brain's voice was heard over Goggle's walkie-talkie, ordering another mutant to kill all the Carters. He also makes a small appearance in the graphic novel The Hills Have Eyes: The Beginning, where his mutilated corpse, dragged from his wheelchair, is found by mutant leader Papa Hades shortly after the events of The Hills Have Eyes.

Relatives: Unknown/none

Big Mama
Big Mama is one of the few female mutants seen, and lacks deformities entirely aside from her baldness and obesity. Big Mama is the counterpart of Mama from the original 1977 version of The Hills Have Eyes, and is played by Ivana Turchetto.

When Doug discovers the nuclear test village, he sees his daughter Catherine is inside Big Mama's house. He sneaks inside, as Big Mama watches television, and manages to sneak past her unnoticed. Doug tries to get back out of the house with Catherine, but Big Mama sees Doug's reflection on the television screen and attacks him, trapping him in a freezer. It is most likely she was killed by Beast off screen.

Relatives: Unknown/none

Cyst

Cyst seems to suffer from neurofibromatosis, which explains the reddish lesions covering his body. He also walks with a limp and has a large neck brace grafted to his body. Cyst was played by Gregory Nicotero, makeup artist of The Hills Have Eyes and The Hills Have Eyes 2.

Cyst is first seen by Doug Bukowski dragging a female corpse through the nuclear test village. As Doug hides behind an old generator, his dog Beast draws Cyst's attention when he lets out a whimper. Cyst drops the body, and inspects the area, but finds nothing, (as Doug and Beast are hiding in a nearby car) and continues dragging the body. He encounters Doug as he leaves Big Brain's house; Doug hides behind a car, and as Cyst approaches, Doug hits him in the knee with an axe, knocking him onto the hood of the car. After Doug hits him in the back with the axe, Cyst falls to the ground, and Doug  impales him through the eye, with the pick end, killing him. With Cyst dead, Doug steals his shotgun, leaving his axe behind.

Cyst makes a small cameo appearance in The Hills Have Eyes: The Beginning, in which he appears on a splash page that portrays Doug's attack on him with the axe.

Relatives: Unknown/none

Goggle

Goggle resides in the hills, and serves as lookout for Jupiter's clan, using a pair of binoculars to spy on their targets; Goggle's attire consists of a large coat and a bowler derby hat, and his mutation consists of him having two patchjob slits on his face in place of a nose, as well as patchy pink and red skin. Goggle is the counterpart of Mercury from the original 1977 version of The Hills Have Eyes. He is portrayed by Ezra Buzzington.

Goggle spends most of the film spying on the Carter family with his binoculars. When the family's pet dog, Beauty, is accidentally let out and runs into the hills, she is found by Goggle, who dismembers her and eats a portion of her leg, leaving Bobby Carter to find her remains. Bobby is knocked unconscious after falling from a hill, and Ruby prevents Goggle from noticing him. Later, while surveying the Carter family trailer, Goggle is brutally attacked by the Carters' other dog, Beast, who tears his throat out and brings his severed arm, with his walkie-talkie still in hand, back to the Carters.

Goggle, identifiable only by his hat, can be seen in The Hills Have Eyes: The Beginning aiding various other mutants in killing the original inhabitants of the nuclear test village; Goggle kills a man repairing his car by slamming the hood of the vehicle down on the man's head.

In order to prepare for his role as Goggle, Ezra Buzzington viewed several programs and documentaries about cases of cannibalism throughout history.

Relatives: Papa Jupiter (father), Lizard (brother), Ruby (sister), Pluto (cousin)

Lizard

Lizard is one of the more violent and merciless of all the mutants; Lizard, along with being very thin and nimble, has a severe cleft lip and malformed jaw. Lizard is played by Robert Joy and is the counterpart of Mars from the original 1977 version of The Hills Have Eyes. He is the film's main antagonist.

When the Carter family is traveling through the desert, Lizard  punctures their tires with a hidden spike strip, leaving them stranded. Lizard later appears aiding Papa Jupiter and Pluto in dragging the semi-conscious Bob Carter into their lair. When the Carter family find Bob being burned alive on a stake, Lizard uses the distraction to sneak into their trailer, where he eats their food and rapes Brenda Carter. When Lynn returns to the trailer, she sees Lizard holding her baby Catherine. After hitting him with a frying pan she is forced to let Lizard drink from her breasts, while Catherine is held at gunpoint. Lynn's mother Ethel returns to the trailer shortly after and tries to hit Lizard with a large rock, but Lizard shoots her, prompting Lynn to stab him in the leg with a screwdriver. Lizard shoots Lynn in the head, before he leaves the trailer with Pluto and the captured Catherine. When Lizard attempts to shoot Brenda he realizes that the gun is empty. Seeing Doug and Bobby returning, he threatens to return for Brenda and flees with Pluto, who has taken Catherine.

Later, Big Brain orders Lizard to kill Catherine, but he finds that Ruby has taken her. Lizard chases Ruby into the hills, and catches up to her just as she is about to return Catherine to Doug. Lizard attacks Doug, leaving Doug incapacitated; however, as Lizard advances on Ruby and Catherine, Doug regains consciousness and brutally beats Lizard with a shotgun, shooting him multiple times. Lizard somehow manages to survive, but as he attempts to shoot Doug, he is tackled off a cliff by Ruby, killing them both.

In The Hills Have Eyes: The Beginning, Lizard is mentioned by mutant leader, Papa Hades, when he is ordered to slash the tires of any vehicle he can find in the nuclear test village the Mutants attack,  and to kill the inhabitants.

Relatives: Papa Jupiter (father), Goggle (brother), Ruby (sister), Pluto (cousin)

Papa Jupiter
Papa Jupiter is the mutant leader and patriarch. He is one of the more violent and psychotic of the clan. In the film, Papa Jupiter displays no actual birth defects, though in "The Making Of..." feature a piece of concept art for the film shows he has a parasitic twin beneath his coat, which was never shown in the film for unexplained reasons. Papa Jupiter is the counterpart of Jupiter from the original 1977 version of The Hills Have Eyes, and is portrayed by actor Billy Drago.

Jupiter is first seen attacking Bob, the patriarch of the Carter family, at the Gas Haven rest stop. He bashes Bob's head against the windshield of a car, knocking him into a delirious state, and drags him off to the mutants' lair with fellow mutants Lizard and Pluto. After Bob, Ethel, and Lynn are all killed, and Doug leaves to search for his daughter Catherine, Jupiter sneaks into their car and steals Ethel's body. Bobby Carter later finds him in the hills eating Ethel's heart. After spotting Bobby, Jupiter chases him back to the Carters' trailer, and accidentally sets off a trap, which causes the trailer to explode with him in it. Jupiter manages to survive the explosion, but is left impaled through the chest by shrapnel. He is left incapable of defending himself when Brenda finishes him off with his own pickaxe.

In the Hills Have Eyes: The Beginning graphic novel, Jupiter makes several cameo appearances, mostly in crowd shots with other mutants; his near-death in the trailer explosion at the end of The Hills Have Eyes is also shown in a panel of the comic. It has been theorized by many fans that he is the brother of Papa Hades, though it is yet to be confirmed.

Relatives: Lizard (son), Goggle (son), Ruby (daughter), Pluto (nephew)

Pluto

Pluto is one of the more imposing mutants, being extremely large and exceptionally strong. Pluto possesses a misshapen head and face and appears to be mentally impaired. He is the counterpart of Pluto from the original 1977 version of The Hills Have Eyes, and is played by Michael Bailey Smith.

Pluto is first seen attacking a trio of men in NBC suits with a pickaxe, before dragging their bodies away with their own pickup truck. He later appears helping Lizard and Papa Jupiter drag the semi-conscious Bob Carter into their lair. Shortly afterwards, he breaks into the Carter family's trailer, and signals his family to set Bob Carter ablaze as a distraction. While in the trailer, Pluto attempts to rape Brenda Carter, but is interrupted by Lizard, who throws him off and rapes Brenda himself. Pluto throws a violent tantrum, only stopping when he notices the infant Catherine Bukowski. Pluto eventually leaves the trailer, taking Catherine with him, after Lizard mortally wounds Ethel Carter and Lynn Bukowski.

Doug Bukowski later encounters Pluto in the nuclear test village while searching for Catherine. Pluto chases Doug throughout Big Brain's house, where he is attacked by Beast. After knocking Beast unconscious, Pluto resumes attacking Doug, slicing off two of his fingers with an axe, and beating Doug into submission. As Doug begs for his life, Big Brain starts mocking him, which distracts Pluto, giving Doug the opportunity to impale his foot with a screwdriver. As Pluto screams in pain, Doug impales his neck with a small American flag, and finally slices his head open with his own axe, killing him.

In The Hills Have Eyes: The Beginning, Pluto makes a small, one-panel appearance, which depicts him finding Catherine in the Carters' trailer.

Relatives: Papa Jupiter (uncle), Lizard (cousin), Goggle (cousin), Ruby (cousin)

Ruby
Ruby is a young member of Jupiter's clan who disagrees with her family's actions. Despite having grown up with a ruthless cannibalistic family, she has somehow managed to kindle her humanity. Several of Ruby's fingers are fused together, possibly from syndactyly, while the appearance of her face suggests Goldenhar syndrome. She is played by actress Laura Ortiz.

Ruby first appears in the film, largely obscured from view, at the Gas Haven, where she takes a red hoodie from the Carters' car, which she wears throughout the rest of the film. When Bobby Carter accidentally knocks himself unconscious Ruby watches over him and protects him from Goggle.

When Lizard receives the order to kill the abducted Catherine Bukowski, Ruby saves her and quickly flees into the hills. She is able to locate Catherine's father, Doug, but just as she is about to give her back, Lizard suddenly attacks him. After incapacitating Doug, Lizard continues to pursue Ruby and Catherine. Before Lizard can harm either one of them, Doug brutally beats him with a shotgun, and shoots him multiple times. Lizard manages to survive but as he is about to shoot Doug, Ruby sacrifices herself by tackling him off a cliff, killing them both.

Relatives: Papa Jupiter (father), Lizard (brother), Goggle (brother), Pluto (cousin)

Venus and Mercury
Venus and Mercury are two mutant children. They are also two of the least dangerous mutants, which can be noted by the fact that they do not attack Doug while he is looking for Baby Catherine, as they are too busy playing with their toys. Like Ruby, Venus possibly has Goldenhar syndrome and Mercury has wide eyes and a skin disorder that causes his flesh to appear bluish. Venus is played by Judith Jane Vallette and Mercury is played by Adam Perrell.
                                                  
Relatives: June(Mother)/Daniel(Father)

Mutants appearing in The Hills Have Eyes 2 (Hades' Clan)

Chameleon
Chameleon is large, tall, and bald. His name is a reference to his skin texture, which is almost like rock (suggesting a severe form of epidermolytic hyperkeratosis), helping him blend in with his surroundings, and his long tongue. Chameleon is one of the more violent mutants, although he has a great fear of his father Hades. 

Chameleon captures a young female soldier named Missy and brings her into the mines, where he attempts to rape her, but before he can do so Missy bites off his tongue, and he is thrown off of Missy by Hades, who rapes her himself. As Chameleon wanders through the mines, he encounters Napoleon and Amber. He blends in with the wall as Napoleon attempts to shoot him. Napoleon manages to shoot him, and Chameleon throws him into a wall. Chameleon then attempts to abduct Amber who gouges his eye out, and Napoleon maniacally pulverizes Chameleon's head with a rock. Chameleon is played by Derek Mears.

Relatives: Papa Hades (father), Letch (brother), Hansel (brother), Karen Sawney Bean (paternal grandmother)

Mutations: rock-like skin and a long tongue

Sniffer
Sniffer is short and nearsighted and relies on his sense of smell in the dark. He attacks people from underground, grabbing their feet. Sniffer's name is a reference to his nearsightedness and that he grabs to find his victims. He's identified in the movie credits as "Sniffer".
He is first seen behind a barricade where he watches the soldiers walk through the tunnels, he then leaves the barricade and alerts the others.
After finding Chameleon dead, Sniffer, having been tracking Chameleon, Delmar and Crank, opens fire on the latter two with their own machine gun, which he stole. After injuring Delmer, Sniffer is killed by him and Crank, who guns him down. Sniffer is portrayed by Gáspár Szabó.

Relatives: Unknown/none

Mutations: nearsightedness

Papa Hades
Hades is the current leader of the Hill People, after his beloved mother Karen Sawney Bean died due to radiation poisoning. Hades possessed a cunning ruthlessness and leadership skills that allowed the Hill People to survive the purge done by the U.S. Army on their home in Yuma Flats. With time and isolation, with the Hill People tribe on the verge of dying out, Hades became increasingly violent and more cruel, focusing on raping and torturing passing females, initially for pleasure, and in the long term for getting them pregnant and giving birth to healthier mutants. Hades has done this at least twice, with an anonymous blonde woman who, while giving birth to their son, was stillborn and as such, Hades killed her with a rock when she couldn't produce healthier offspring. Hades tried again when his children were battling a trainee squad of National Guardsmen, by taking a captured female soldier, PFC "Missy" Martinez, and proceeds to overpower, beat, rape and probably impregnate her. Hades is later killed in combat, after being shot and beaten and ultimately impaled through the mouth by Napoleon's bayonet-equipped rifle. Hades is played by Michael Bailey Smith, who also played
the character of Pluto in the 2006 remake. It could be hinted that he could be related to the Jupiter family.

Relatives: Karen Sawney Bean (mother), Papa Jupiter (Possible brother) Chameleon (son), Letch (son), Hansel (son), Pluto (possible son)

Mutations: none/unknown

Hansel
Hansel is a large member of the clan with a childlike demeanor - he is an enormous simpleton. Like Ruby from the first film, he is totally against what his family is and tries to help normal people when they are in danger. Hansel is the third son of Papa Hades.

In the alternate ending it is revealed that Hansel was in on his family members' plan all along, and when the three survivor's escape the mines, he is waiting for them, laughing while eating a human body part, telling the three surviving soldiers to "Run away!", as if he were distracting them, much like he did at the beginning of the film when he distracted a scientist, as Letch put an axe through the scientist's head. He is the only confirmed son of Papa Hades to survive the events of the film. Hansel is played by David Reynolds.

Relatives: Papa Hades (father), Chameleon (brother), Letch (brother), Karen Sawney Bean (paternal grandmother)

Mutations: none/unknown

Letch 
Letch is another violent attacker of the hill people and is one of Hades' children. He has tumor like growths all over his face and body, similar to the welts and scabs on Chameleon. Despite his large frame, he is agile. Letch is a ruthless killer and goes around wearing looted army attire.

Letch first kills Dr. Foster by swinging an axe into his head, then he brutally injures Colonel Redding by impaling him with a spear and swinging him over a cliff. When the soldiers arrive, he kills Stump, as he is climbing down a jagged cliff, charging from a cave and slicing off his arm, which he uses to wave to Stump as he falls to his death. Letch later shoves Napoleon to the ground as he is inspecting various dummies placed in a room, attempting to attack Amber. Letch is poised to rape Amber, but his foot is sliced by Napoleon's bayonet, and then Amber repeatedly stabs him with the bayonet, killing him. Letch is played by Jason Oettle.

Relatives: Papa Hades (father), Chameleon (brother), Hansel (brother), Karen Sawney Bean (paternal grandmother)

Mutations: tumor-like growths on face and body

Stabber
Stabber is one of the more violent members of the Hades' Clan. His head and jaw are deformed, and he has pieces of flesh and skin missing. Stabber's weapon is a cleaver. He is also quite resilient, surviving a direct gunshot. He is first seen attacking Amber
who has gone to search for the others but before he could capture Amber, Mickey shoots him in the shoulder.

Throughout the film, he appears, harassing soldiers. Stabber is finally killed when he is lured into a trap where he is shot repeatedly. Stabber is played by Tyrell Kemlo.

Relatives: Unknown/none

Mutations: deformed head and jaw and missing pieces of skin

Unknown Watcher
At the end of the film, one last mutant was shown wearing a tattered leather glove, similar to Lizard's. He or she is frustrated about the events.

Mutants appearing in The Hills Have Eyes: The Beginning

Blair 

Blair was a member of Hades Clan. As a mutant, she was morbidly obese and possesses a pig-like face, and had only three-fingered-hands. When the army begins its invasion of the mutant' town, Blair is put in charge of a group of mutants and asked by Hades to get information on imminent reinforcements. Blair and her men find two female soldiers; Lieutenant Bishop and Jones, bagging and tagging the crucified bodies of the police who came before the army, and successfully capture, bound, gag, strip and gang rape the two women. After finding out further information, an attack on the army camp ensues. Among those killed is a mutant strongly resembling her as seen being gunned down by a man (who also appears to be a mutant) wielding a machine-gun and opening fire at a group of people. After this, she is not seen again.

Relatives: Unknown/none

Karen Sawney Bean 
The mother of Hades and original leader of the Mutants, Karen Sawney Bean is apparently descended from Sawney Bean, a legendary Scottish serial killer and cannibal.

Karen originally lived in Yuma Flats with her husband Dan and their unnamed son, living, for the most part, a simple life. When the U.S. army attempted to buy Yuma Flats for nuclear testing, Karen, along with the rest of the towns inhabitants, refused to sell their homes. This refusal culminated in group of drunken soldiers returning to Karen's home in the night and forcing her and her family out on to the street. Made to watch as Lieutenant Ryan brutalized her husband and threatened her son, Karen witnessed Lieutenant Ryan accidentally shoot and kill Dan before fleeing the scene, though not before threatening Karen and her child.

Dan's death by soldiers apparently caused Karen to rally her neighbors into taking vengeance on the army, as the next day, several army personnel returning to Yuma Flats to try and re-negotiate with the people there, were killed or injured by snipers in an attack led by Karen. This attack caused the army to retaliate against the people of Yuma Flats with extreme prejudice, as the next day they invaded with tanks. During this attack, Karen and her son were found and held captive in a dilapidated house by Lieutenant Ryan, who had lost a portion of his ear in the sniping attack. After killing Karen's son and beating her, Lieutenant Ryan was stopped from raping Karen by a superior officer, who restrained and reprimanded Ryan and freed Karen, who, while fleeing, stole Lieutenant Ryan's dog tags.

As Yuma Flats was destroyed and turned into a nuclear testing range, Karen, along with what was left of the inhabitants of Yuma Flats, lived in some nearby mines as atomic testing took place nearby. Acting as the leader of her fellows in the mines, Karen and them survived off supplies sold to them by a gas station proprietor named Jeb. It was sometime after the army finally stopped its nuclear testing that Karen and her people moved out of the mines and into the nuclear testing villages built by the military, it was also around this time that Karen discovered she was pregnant, despite not having sex since Dan had been murdered.

In the nuclear testing village, Karen still acted as leader, much to the resentment of a man named Patrick, who was suspicious of Karen's pregnancy. Karen eventually gave birth to a horrifically deformed son she named Hades, and whom she loved dearly despite his physical appearance. Having witnessed Hades' birth while spying on Karen, Patrick, disgusted by the child, who he was convinced was a bad omen and of Satanic origin, used intimidation to turn the townspeople against Karen. One night, Patrick confronted Karen with the townspeople and gave her an ultimatum—leave the town or be killed. Karen did leave the town, though not before killing and decapitating Patrick in revenge for threatening her.

Left to live in the mines with Hades, Karen and he were soon joined by others who had also given birth to mutant offspring and were driven from the town. After Jeb, who had been supplying Karen, became unable to sell anymore to her due to his business being strained, Karen made a deal with him; Jeb and his family would lure unsuspecting people into her and the Mutants' territory, where they would be killed and eaten, and in exchange, Karen would give Jeb any valuables they took from the travelers. After years of living like this, Karen eventually began to succumb to radiation poisoning caused by the nuclear radiation she had been exposed to years earlier. Becoming emaciated and bald, Karen, realizing her time had come, passed leadership of the Hill People on to Hades, telling him to keep her line alive (this, combined with the tribe almost becoming extinct following the army's purge, leads the mutants to adopt the policy of capturing, torturing and raping females until they fall pregnant and give birth to the mutants' offspring). After her death, Karen was buried in the makeshift cemetery passed through by Doug Bukowski in the first The Hills Have Eyes film.

Relatives: Papa Hades (son), Chameleon (grandson), Letch (grandson), Hansel (grandson)

Suzie 
A young female mutant, Suzie has an emaciated appearance, being almost skeletally thin, and abnormally thin face and slanted eyes, as well as red hair (appearing blonde in the comic). It is mentioned that her father's name is Razor. In The Hills Have Eyes: The Beginning, Hades, in a plan to hijack one of the tanks brought in by the army for their assault on the mutant town, decides to use Suzie as a distraction. Made to wear an oversized hoodie, Suzie was placed in front of a tank and managed to lure the soldiers out of it, them believing that Suzie was a normal girl due to her mutation being obscured by clothing.

Upon seeing that Suzie was a mutant, the soldiers were attacked by mutants, who proceeded to try and steal their tank; Suzie was apparently killed when a second tank operated by soldiers, seeing the mutants killing their fellows and trying to take the other tank, opened fire on them, instantly killing several of them and incinerating Suzie's lower body.

Relatives: Razor (father)

Other appearances 

Several zombie-like Mutants appear as generic enemies in the Hills Have Eyes game and the game "Mutant Massacre", both of which are located on the official sites for The Hills Have Eyes and The Hills Have Eyes 2; as well as lunging at the protagonist, some of these Mutants attack with weapons, such as axes.

Reception and criticism 

Both Richard Roeper and Roger Ebert have criticized the mutants as being bland and personality-less monsters that had no character development and whose sole purpose was "to disgust us"; they have also stated that they would have wanted to see the mutant's lifestyles in more detail and learn more about characters such as Ruby and Big Brain, citing film The Devil's Rejects as a good example of showing and developing a "psycho family".

References 

Fictional mutants
Fictional families
Fictional cannibals
Fictional monsters
Human-derived fictional species
Fictional characters from New Mexico
Fictional serial killers
Lists of fictional humanoid species
Mutants